Kalisz Region is a historical and ethnographical area of Poland, located in central Poland mainly in the Greater Poland Lakes Area and South Greater Poland Plain. It forms the eastern part of Greater Poland proper.

Kalisz Region encompasses the area of the former Kalisz Voivodeship, south of Lake Gopło as well as Wieluń Land. In the north it borders Kuyavia, in the south it borders Lower Silesia, in the west it borders Poznań Region and in the east it borders with Sieradz Land and Lęczyca Land.

The largest city of the region is Kalisz, other large towns include: Konin, Ostrów Wielkopolski, Jarocin, Wieluń, Koło, Krotoszyn, Września, Kępno, Środa Wielkopolska, Pleszew, Ostrzeszów and Zagórów.

Kalisz Region is inhabited by an ethnographical group called Kaliszanie.

References 

Kalisz
Geography of Greater Poland Voivodeship